Milan Mirosavljev (born 24 April 1995) is a Serbian footballer who plays as a forward for Latvian club Liepāja.

Career

Club
Mirosavljev previously played with Polet Sivac, Hajduk Kula, Dolina Padina and PIK Prigrevica.

On 3 July 2019, Mirosavljev was released by Irtysh Pavlodar.

References

External links
 
 Milan Mirosavljev stats at utakmica.rs 
 
 

1995 births
People from Vrbas, Serbia
Living people
Serbian footballers
Association football forwards
FK Hajduk Kula players
FK Dolina Padina players
FK Proleter Novi Sad players
FK Budućnost Podgorica players
FK Vojvodina players
FC Irtysh Pavlodar players
FK Liepāja players
Serbian First League players
Serbian SuperLiga players
Montenegrin First League players
Kazakhstan Premier League players
Latvian Higher League players
Serbian expatriate footballers
Expatriate footballers in Montenegro
Expatriate footballers in Kazakhstan
Expatriate footballers in Latvia
Serbian expatriate sportspeople in Montenegro
Serbian expatriate sportspeople in Kazakhstan
Serbian expatriate sportspeople in Latvia